The governor of Nagaland is the head of state of Nagaland and the representative of the president of India in the state.

Powers and functions

The governor enjoys many different types of powers:

Executive powers related to administration, appointments and removals,
Legislative powers related to lawmaking and the state legislature, that is Vidhan Sabha or Vidhan Parishad, and
Discretionary powers to be carried out according to the discretion of the governor.

Governors of Nagaland

See also
 Nagaland
 Governors of India
 Chief Minister of Nagaland

Notes and references

External links
 https://web.archive.org/web/20070208084406/http://www.nagaland.nic.in/functionaries/rajbhavan/list.htm

Nagaland
 
Governors

https://nagaland.gov.in/governors